Passionoia is the third and final studio album by British pop band Black Box Recorder, released in 2003.

Reception

Passionoia was met with generally favourable reviews from music critics. At Metacritic, which assigns a normalized rating out of 100 to reviews from mainstream publications, the album received an average score of 70, based on ten reviews.

Track listing
All songs written by Luke Haines and John Moore.

 "The School Song"  – 3:41
 "Gsoh Q.E.D."  – 3:46
 "British Racing Green"  – 4:34
 "Being Number One"  – 3:26
 "The New Diana"  – 2:49
 "These Are the Things"  – 3:58
 "Andrew Ridgeley"  – 3:47
 "When Britain Refused to Sing"  – 3:14
 "Girl's Guide for the Modern Diva"  – 4:09
 "I Ran All the Way Home"  – 4:27

Personnel
Personnel per booklet and sleeve.

Black Box Recorder
 John Moore – instruments
 Sarah Nixey – vocals
 Luke Haines – instruments

Additional musicians
 Tim Weller – drums (tracks 3, 9 and 10)

Production and design
 Black Box Recorder – producer
 Pete Hofmann – producer, mixing, engineer
 Steve Double – photography
 Small Japanese Soldier – design

References

2003 albums
Black Box Recorder albums
One Little Independent Records albums